The 2020 season of the Taiwan Football Premier League is the fourth season of top-flight association football competition in Taiwan under its current format. The Taiwan Football Premier League includes eight teams. The season began on 12 April 2020.

Being one of only six football leagues underway in the world as of early May 2020 (along with Belarus, South Korea, Turkmenistan, Burundi and Nicaragua), the TFPL received greater international exposure because other leagues, such as the Premier League in England, La Liga in Spain, and Serie A in Italy, remained severely impacted by the COVID-19 pandemic and were unable to continue their seasons until several weeks later.

Due to the COVID-19 pandemic, no fans were allowed to attend the first round of the competition.

After two round-robins, ended in August 8th, Taipower, Taiwan Steel and Taichung Futuro have mathematically secured their places in the 2021 Taiwan Football Premier League. Hang Yuen has ensured that they will not be regulated directly.

After round 15, Taiwan Steel win against Ming Chuan, Hang Yuen has mathematically secured their places in the 2021 Taiwan Football Premier League and Tatung has ensured that they will not be regulated directly from the later round.

After round 17, Tatung has mathematically secured their places in the 2021 Taiwan Football Premier League and NTUS has ensured that they will not be regulated directly with their winning to Ming Chuan.

From the following round after round 18, NTUS has ensured that they will not be regulated with Taipower win against Red Lions FC.

With a essential win against Ming Chuan, Red Lions FC will be playing in the relegation play-off game against 2nd Div's 2nd place Inter Taoyuan. While Ming Chuan are going down to the 2nd Div next year. 

Taiwan Steel are crowned Taiwanese Champion on the 20th round after a 3-1 against Hang Yuen to ensure Taipower couldn't catch them in the title race. It is Taiwan Steel's 1st champion in their history.

Teams
A total of eight teams compete in the league. Tatung are the defending champions.

Hang Yuen (航源)
Ming Chuan (銘傳大學)
NTUS (璉紅臺體)
Red Lions FC (紅獅FC)
Taichung Futuro (台中 FUTURO)
Taiwan Steel (台灣鋼鐵)
Taipower (高市台電)
Tatung (北市大同)

League table
</noinclude>
<noinclude>

Tatung v Hang Yuen draw was changed to 3:0 win for Tatung due to Hang Yuen using too many foreign players, original result was 2:2

Results
Each team plays a total of 21 games, playing the others three times.

Results 1–14

Results 15–21 

Tatung v Hang Yuen draw was awarded a 3:0 win for Tatung due to Hang Yuen using too many foreign players, original result was 2:2.

Promotion/relegation play-off
At the end of the season, the eighth-placed team from the TFPL, Red Lions, entered a play-off with Inter Taoyuan, the second-placed team from the 2020 Taiwan Football Challenge League for a spot in the 2021 Taiwan Football Premier League.

Statistics

Top scorers

References

External links
Chinese Taipei Football Association

Taiwan Football Premier League seasons
Taiwan
1